Jol Nupur was a Bengali television serial which aired on Bengali GEC Star Jalsha by Magic Moments Motion Pictures. This is the second serial in Star Jalsha by Magic Moments Motion Pictures after Ishti Kutum and the third longest running among all the serials produced by Magic Moments Motion Pictures, preceded by Ishti Kutum in Star Jalsha followed by Binni Dhaner Khoi in ETV Bangla. The show was telecast at Mon - Sat 9:30 p.m. Jol Nupur replaced Sansaar Sukher Hoy Romonir Guney from 21 January 2013. It starred Lovely Maitra, Souptik Chakraborty (later replaced by Fahim Mirza) and Aparajita Adhya in lead roles. After running successfully for almost 3 years and airing 901 episodes, the show went off-air on 5 December 2015 on a happy note to make way for Punyi Pukur.

Plot 

The story revolves around Kajal, a girl from Orissa and an expert in the dance form Odissi, and a man from the city Arin Basu Mallik, named Neel. Neel is from a wealthy and established family and man of principles, while Kajal or Kaju is soft-hearted and strong character who believes in the basic virtues of life. The show is basically a love story of Kaju and Neel in the backdrop of the sea. The waves of the sea seem to wash away all differences in their culture and lifestyles and tie them in an internal union.

Kaju and Arin meet on the sea-beach when Arin had gone there on a holiday. Neel develops feelings for Kaju. When Neel and Kaju accidentally and unintentionally perform some of the Hindu marriage rituals, the pujaris of the Jagannath temple threat to turn Kaju into a Devdasi and so Kaju becomes forced to marry Neel.

When the two come to Kolkata, Neel's family members are not ready to accept Kaju and she has to face many hurdles, especially the ill-intended Bhoomi, Neel's elder sister-in-law. But she also has some supportive people by her side - Neel's uncle, who is the third son of Purnendusekhar Basu Mallik, head of the family, Neel's aunt, Aparajita (also called Pari) who is a mental patient and a special child. Pari also sings beautifully. Pari's music teacher and mentor is Amartya.

Eventually the family members accept Kaju and Kaju wins an Odissi dance competition, defeating Bhoomi. Later, we come to know, that Bhoomi is actually Kaju's cousin and Kaju is the daughter of the dance maestro Surya Panigrahi, who is now dead. Kajal's mother, Urbhashi and Bhoomi's mother, Srishti Mukherjee, are sisters.The power hungry Srishti had succeeded in establishing herself as an Odissi dancer.

But soon circumstances demand Neel and Kaju to get divorced due to Arin's friend, Arshi, who in turn marries Neel. Kaju happens to leave the Basu Mallik house and seek refuge in the house of an old Odissi dancer. Later, we come to know that the man is none other than Surya Panigrahi and Srishti had planned to kill him in order to emerge as an unparalleled dancer. So now, Kaju's birth details are unveiled. Kaju now starts getting trained in Odissi vigorously by her father and wins a national-level dance competition. On the other hand, Neel becomes physically weak and ill.

In the meantime, other affairs creep in - Pari wins a national-level singing competition with the help of Amartya, who had married her also. At the same time, both Neel's family and Kaju have to face various calamities due to the ill-intended Bhoomi and Arshi. Pari has to face major hurdles, as Amartya's sister-in-law was not ready to accept her. Due to certain calamities like Amartya falling sick and losing his voice, force Pari to earn money by singing following which she gets blamed by Amartya's sister-in-law that Pari was a thief. Eventually she is proved wrong and her son, Judo, marries Neel's sister.

Another character, Minu, comes up at this point. She happened to be neighbour of the Basu Mallik family when the family used to live in the village. She stood by the side of the Basu Mallik family and helped them in their crisis and later married Chhoton, third son of Purnendusekhar.

Discrepancies creep in even in her married life, when it is revealed that Minu was a widow and this was her second marriage. But Chhoton stands by her side and helps her in every such incident. Even in some cases Kaju helps her and the Basu Mallik family. In spite of all these affairs, Kaju's love for Neel or Neel's love for Kaju has not come to an end. The soap explores their relationship.

Cast

Main 
 Lovely Maitra as Sankhamala Panigrahi Basu Mallick aka Kaju/Kajal – Neel's first wife. (2013 – 2015)
Souptic Chakraborty / Fahim Mirza as Arin Basu Mallik aka Neel – Kajol aka Kaju's husband. (2013 – 2015) 
 Aparajita Adhya as Aparajita Chowdhury (née Basu Mallick) aka Pari – a singer and mentally retarded daughter of Radharani and Purnendu, Amartya's widow (2013 – 2015)

Recurring 
 Pijush Ganguly as Amartya Chowdhury - Pari's mentor and later on, husband.(deceased)
Sabitri Chatterjee as Kamalinee Basu Mallick aka " Sona thamma "
 Soumitra Chatterjee as Krishnendushekhar Basu Mallick - Kamalinee's husband.
 Anusuya Majumdar as Radharani Basu Mallick -  Neel's grandmother.
 Santu Mukherjee as Purnendushekhar Basu Mallick - Neel's grandfather.
 Bhaskar Banerjee as Bhombol- Lal and Rumi's father,Bhoomi's father-in-law,Purnendu-Radharani's eldest son
 Bidipta Chakraborty as Anjana Basu Mallick - Lal's mother and Bhoomi's mother-in-law, Neel's elder paternal aunt.
 Diganta Bagchi as Subhankar Basu Mallick - Neel's father, Purnendu Shekhar-Radharani's second son.
 Rajashree Bhowmik as Sreemoyee Basu Mallick - Neel's mother, Subhankar's wife, Kaju's mother-in-law.
 Biswanath Basu as Chhoton - Neel's uncle, Purnendu Shekhar-Radharani's third (youngest) son.
 Sonali Chowdhury as Mrinalini Basu Mallick aka Minu - Chhoton's wife, a primary school principal.
 Indrajit Deb as Mrinalini's father
 Ronnie Chakraborty as Laal - Neel's elder cousin brother, Bhoomi's husband.(deceased)
 Sneha Chatterjee as Bhoomisuta Basu Mallick (née Pattanayak) aka Bhoomi - Laal's wife, Kaju's elder maternal cousin sister. 
 Priyadarshini Chatterjee as Rumi - Lal's younger sister.
 Priya Paul as Mimi Chowdhury (née Basu Mallick) - Neel's younger sister, Judo's wife.
 Debottam Majumder as Budhaditya Chowdhury aka Judo - Amartya's nephew, Mimi's husband.
 Rita Dutta Chakraborty as Nandini Chowdhury - Judo's mother, Amartya's sister-in-law (who has a crush on him).
 Rohit Mukherjee as Judo's father,Amartya's elder brother
 Runa Bandyapadhyay as Amartya's elder cousin sister
 Neel Mukherjee as Surjo Panigrahi - Kaju's father.
 Badshah Maitra as Binayak Pattanayak - Bhoomi's father, Shrishti's husband, Kaju's maternal uncle, and a scientist.
 Anushree Das as Srishti Mukherjee - Bhoomi's mother,Binayak's wife, Urbashi's sister and Kaju's maternal aunt.
 Sagarika Roy as Urboshi- Kaju's mother
 Saktipada Dey as Raghubir
 Sudipta Banerjee as Arshi Basu Mallick - Neel's friend and later, his second wife.
 Bimal Chakraborty as Arshi's father
 Anindita Saha as Arshi's mother
 Koushik Sen as Raja- Krishnendu's ex-student,Devika's husband
 Kalyani Mondal as Raja's mother
 Ashok Bhattacharya as Raja's father
 Lopamudra Sinha as Devika- Raja's love interest and later turned his wife
 Sourav Das as Chandan- Kaju's tutor, Rumi's love interest
 Shrila Majumder as Surjo's aunt
 Avrajit Chakraborty as Samrat-  Bhoomi's second husband

Awards and honors

Adaptations

References

External links
 Jol Nupur on Disney+ Hotstar 
 

2013 Indian television series debuts
Star Jalsha original programming
Bengali-language television programming in India
2015 Indian television series endings